The Turkmenistan Championship is the national hockey championship in Turkmenistan. It involves 8 professional clubs of various ministries, departments and institutions of Turkmenistan. The tournament is held for 3 months in Ashgabat. Competitions are held in two rounds on 28 games each. The teams placing first through fourth place in the championship, will compete with each Cup of Turkmenistan. The first season of the tournament took place in the 2013/2014 year.

Current teams

Former participating teams 
 Merdana (State Border Service of Turkmenistan)

Champions
2020: Galkan HC
2019: Galkan HC
2018: Galkan HC
2017: Galkan HC
2016: Galkan HC
2015: Galkan HC
2014: Galkan HC

References

Ice hockey leagues in Asia
Ice hockey in Turkmenistan
Sports leagues established in 2013
2013 establishments in Turkmenistan